Royal Air Charter Service, Inc., operating as Royal Air Philippines, is a Philippine-registered budget airline. The company was established on August 22, 2002 as a chartered airline. It began operations as a budget airline on December 14, 2018, with an inaugural flight from its hub in Clark, Pampanga to Caticlan in Aklan.

The airline currently operates a fleet of an Airbus A319-100, Airbus A320-200 aircraft, and provides domestic and international non-scheduled airline and cargo services to Manila, Lal-lo, Caticlan, Clark, Cebu, Nanning, Kalibo, Kunming, Shenzhen, and Macau.

History 
Royal Air Charter Service began its operations on August 22, 2002 as a charter airline. The airline began increasing its chartered domestic and international flights after it was granted the right to provide chartered air services through a Certificate of Public Convenience and Necessity (CPCN) issued by the Civil Aeronautics Board (CAB) in May 2017. On June 21, 2018, the airline began regular daily flights from Cebu to Macau using ex-SWISS BAe Avro RJ100 aircraft. On July 27, the airline announced that it was working with the Philippines' Department of Tourism to establish a regular daily charter service between Macau and Subic Bay.

On July 26, 2018, the CAB gave the airline the authority to operate as a commercial scheduled domestic and international flights. By September 2018, the company announced that it would commence daily domestic commercial operations from Clark International Airport in Pampanga on November 12, 2018 to five destinations, namely, Cebu, Caticlan in Aklan, Tagbilaran in Bohol and Puerto Princesa and San Vicente in Palawan. On December 14, 2018, the airline had its inaugural domestic commercial flight from Clark to Caticlan and back. The company further expanded its international charter service and domestic commercial operations after it was able to lease two Airbus A319 aircraft from Cambodian budget carrier Lanmei Airlines. The airline began offering charter flights from Cambodia and China to key Philippine cities such as Clark, Manila, Kalibo and Puerto Princesa. On May 19, 2019, the airline announced the opening of its Cebu hub and launched its inaugural Cebu to Davao flight, with four flights a week between the two cities.

On August 18, 2019, the airline began operating twice a week chartered flights between Macau, Cagayan North International Airport within the Cagayan Special Economic Zone in Lal-lo, Cagayan, and Clark. The company thus became the first airline to operate in the airport, which opened in 2016. However, on January 31, 2020, the airline temporarily ceased its Macau-Lal-lo flights after the COVID-19 pandemic began. The airline also suspended its charter flights between Wuhan and Kalibo on January 23 following the COVID-19 outbreak there.

On January 6, 2020, the airline added its first Airbus A320-200 to its fleet. The aircraft was previously in service with Lanmei Airlines and was leased from Minsheng Financial Leasing. The aircraft entered service with the airline on January 9, with an inaugural flight from Manila to Sihanoukville in Cambodia.

Features and amenities
Royal Air Philippines passengers currently receive  free check-in allowance on top of the  allowance on hand-carry items. The airline also offers in-flight entertainment through its Sapphire In-Flight Entertainment Platform, which is a partnership with Global JD Capital Pte Ltd. In August 2020, the airline announced a partnership with Sabre Corporation that enabled the airline to use Sabre distribution software in its ticketing systems.

Destinations
, Royal Air Philippines serves the following destinations:

Fleet

References

External links 
Official website
Flights going to Cebu
Domestic routes
Commercial flights

Airlines of the Philippines
Companies based in Parañaque
Airlines established in 2002
Philippine companies established in 2002